Oula is a village in southern Mali.

Oula may also refer to:

People
 Oula Jääskeläinen (born 1969), Finnish figure skater
 Oula Palve (born 1992), Finnish ice hockey player
 Oula A. Alrifai (born 1986), Syrian-American writer, senior fellow at The Washington Institute for Near East Policy
 Oula Abass Traoré (born 1995), a Burkinabé footballer
 Innocent Oula (born 1961), Ugandan army officer
 Gaston Oula, Ivorian judoka at the 1984 Olympics

Places
 Ula (Caria), western Anatolia, a town of ancient Caria
 Oula Department, a department of Burkina Faso
 Oula Township, Gansu, China

See also
 Oola (disambiguation)